Timiryazev is a district of North Kazakhstan Region in northern Kazakhstan. The administrative center of the district is the town of Timiryazevo. Population:

References

Districts of Kazakhstan
North Kazakhstan Region